Matangi is a settlement in the Waikato District on the eastern border of Hamilton. It is surrounded by many lifestyle blocks, but the village centre has Matangi School (opened 1910, with 141 students and 6 teachers), a garage, Four Square, takeaway and café, Matangi Hall, St David’s church and Matangi recreation reserve.

Demographics

Matangi had these census results:

Geology 
The area lies on Matangi soils, formed on the edge of the Komakorau Bog and the Waikato's alluvial plains of sands and gravels.

History

 The natural vegetation would have been mostly have been a mixed bush of totara, matai, rimu, kahikatea, titoki, tawa, and rewarewa. Virtually nothing remains of it. These original owners lost most of their land to confiscation or sales following the 1860s New Zealand wars.

In 1884, the Cambridge branch opened with a station at Tamahere, renamed Matangi in 1906. A creamery opened in 1885, then cheese factories and, in 1917, they amalgamated to form the New Zealand Dairy Association Group. Further amalgamation followed and in 1919 New Zealand Co-operative Dairy Company Ltd opened its new dairy factory to produce dried milk for Glaxo. At the time it was the largest in the country, able to deal with  a day. It was an early customer of the Central Waikato Electric Power Board in 1921, when 12 local households were also connected. From 1919 until its closure in 1987, the Matangi dairy factory also produced milk powder, condensed milk and cheese. Since the mid 2000s the factory has become the centre of a history precinct, with historic buildings moved in to form a square beside it.

Further rail sidings were added, along with a stationmaster and maintenance crews. In 1902, the first Matangi post office opened and in 1906, a telegram service was added, the school in 1910, bulk stores, marshalling yards and a community hall followed. After closure of the dairy factory, the post office and telephone exchange also closed.

More recently, relaxation of subdivision rules have changed Matangi from a rural community to an area of rural residential development for Hamilton commuters.

Marae

The local marae, Te Iti a Hauā Marae or Tauwhare Marae, is a meeting place of the Ngāti Hauā hapū of Ngāti Te Oro, Ngāti Te Rangitaupi, Ngāti Waenganui and Ngāti Werewere, and is affiliated with Waikato Tainui. It includes the Hauā meeting house.

In October 2020, the Government committed $734,311 from the Provincial Growth Fund to upgrade the marae and 4 other Ngāti Hauā marae, creating 7 jobs.

Education

References

External links 
1:50,000 map
Matangi picture on Google Maps street scene

Waikato District
Populated places in Waikato